Saskia Beinhard (born 2 March 1999 in Munich) is a German professional squash player. As of December 2022, she was ranked number 64  in the world.

References

1999 births
Living people
German female squash players
20th-century German women
21st-century German women
Competitors at the 2022 World Games